Mattijs Branderhorst (born 31 December 1993) is a Dutch professional footballer who plays for Eredivisie club NEC as a goalkeeper.

Club career

Willem II
Branderhorst came through the youth ranks at Willem II from his childhood club Theole. On 18 November 2011, he was included in the first-team squad for the first time. In a match against Almere City, manager Jurgen Streppel kept him on the bench for the entire game. In the years that followed, Branderhorst became a regular starter in the reserve team of the Tilburg-based side, which featured players such as Virgil van Dijk and Frenkie de Jong.

Branderhorst was loaned to MVV in 2015. There, he made his professional debut on 13 September 2015 as a substitute for the injured Jo Coppens against NAC Breda.

He made his debut for Willem II on 15 October 2017 in the home match against FC Twente. In the match, he made the start for the injured Timon Wellenreuther.

NEC
On 28 January 2019, Branderhorst was loaned to NEC for the remainder of the season. On 1 February, he made his debut in the 4–1 home win over Jong FC Utrecht. After the loan ended, NEC brought him to Nijmegen on a permanent deal, with him signing a contract for two seasons. 

The second season he was the undisputed starter in goal and played all matches until the competition was shut down due to the COVID-19 pandemic. He started the 2020–21 season as second goalkeeper, behind Norbert Alblas, who had recovered from an injury. He did, however, start the two KNVB Cup matches against Fortuna Sittard and VVV-Venlo. On 26 February 2021, manager Rogier Meijer decided to switch goalkeepers: after a number of unfortunate performances by Alblas, Branderhorst became the starting goalkeeper again. On 23 May, Branderhorst won promotion with NEC to the Eredivisie, by beating NAC Breda 2–1 in the final of the play-offs. He signed a new two-year contract on 22 June 2021.

In his first season with NEC in the Eredivisie, he was the starting goalkeeper after winning the position battle with Danny Vukovic. He immediately managed to keep three clean sheets in the first four games. That season, only Remko Pasveer of Ajax and Lars Unnerstall from Twente had more clean sheets than Branderhorst. Despite his strong performances through the season, NEC brought back Netherlands international goalkeeper Jasper Cillessen, who they signed from Valencia in August 2022, demoting Branderhorst to backup for the 2022–23 season.

Career statistics

References

External links
 

Living people
1993 births
People from Tiel
Association football goalkeepers
Dutch footballers
Willem II (football club) players
MVV Maastricht players
NEC Nijmegen players
Eredivisie players
Eerste Divisie players
Footballers from Gelderland